Diplonearcha is a genus of moths belonging to the subfamily Olethreutinae of the family Tortricidae.

See also
List of Tortricidae genera

References

Tortricidae genera
Olethreutinae